Synapse is a peer-reviewed scientific journal of  neuroscience published in New York City by Wiley-Liss to address basic science topics on synaptic function and structure. The editor-in-chief is
Benjamin J. Hall (H. Lundbeck A/S). According to the Journal Citation Reports, the journal has a 2020 impact factor of 2.562, ranking it 201st out of 273 journals in the category "Neurosciences".

References

Wiley-Liss academic journals
English-language journals
Neuroscience journals
Publications established in 1999